Garvald can refer to:

 Garvald, East Lothian
 Garvald, Scottish Borders
 Garvald, South Lanarkshire